Outlaws and Angels is a live album by American country and western musician Willie Nelson. It was recorded on May 5, 2004, at The Wiltern in Los Angeles, California. It was released on September 21, 2004, by the Lost Highway label. The concert featured guest performers singing duets with Nelson on each song and was later aired on cable television.

Track listing

"Rainin' in My Heart" is a Wille Nelson/Al Green duet cover of a song co-written by Green for his 2003 album, I Can't Stop.  Certain song databases have mistakenly classified Green's song as a cover of Slim Harpo's "Rainin' in My Heart", written by James Moore (aka Slim Harpo) and Jerry West (aka J.D. Miller).

Personnel
Willie Nelson - acoustic guitar, vocals
 Garrett Adkins - trombone
 James Caan - emcee
 Bill Churchville - trumpet
 Jim Cox - keyboards
 Hutch Hutchinson - bass
 Jim Keltner - drums
 Greg Leisz - pedal steel guitar
 Nils Lofgren - guitar
 Kenny Lovelace - guitar
 Ivan Neville - piano
 Mickey Raphael - harmonica
 Jimmy Ripp - guitar
 Peter Tilden - spoken voice
 Biff Watson - guitar
 David Woodford - saxophone
Backing vocals
 Bernard Fowler
 Stacie Michelle
 Julia Waters Tillman
 Maxine Waters Willard

Chart performance

Certifications

References

External links
 Willie Nelson's Official Website
 Lost Highway Records' Official Website

2004 live albums
Willie Nelson live albums
albums produced by James Stroud
Lost Highway Records live albums